The 1908 Buchtel football team represented Buchtel College in the 1908 college football season. The team was led by first-year head coach Dwight Bradley, in his only season. Buchtel was outscored by their opponents by a total of 32–80.

Schedule

References

Buchtel
Akron Zips football seasons
Buchtel football